The Mendihuaca River is a river in northeastern Colombia that originates in the Sierra Nevada de Santa Marta mountain range and discharges into the Caribbean Sea. The watershed is considered threatened due to deforestation in the area near the river's source.

References

Rivers of Colombia
Sierra Nevada de Santa Marta